is a hill to the west of Nagasaki which rises to a height of . The Nagasaki Ropeway allows visitors to travel to the top from Nagasaki. A short walk from the cable car station are several buildings that house transmitters for TV and radio stations that serve Nagasaki and the surrounding area.

There is an observation platform that is popular with tourists as it provides extensive views of Nagasaki's .

References

External links

Nagasaki Ropeway 
Guide to Mount Inasa (published by Nagasaki Prefecture) 

Landforms of Nagasaki Prefecture
Hills of Japan